Grigor Dimitrov defeated Nick Kyrgios in the final, 6–3, 7–5 to win the men's singles tennis title at the 2017 Cincinnati Masters. It was his first Masters 1000 title, and he did not lose a set en route.

Marin Čilić was the reigning champion, but did not participate.

Given the withdrawals of Novak Djokovic, Andy Murray, and Roger Federer (all due to injury), Rafael Nadal was the only member of the Big Four to play. His loss in the quarterfinals to Kyrgios ended a streak of 42 consecutive Masters 1000 events where at least one of the four reached the final (also winning a combined 37 titles). Nonetheless, Nadal regained the world No. 1 singles ranking for the first time since July 2014. Nadal became the world No. 1 with only 7,645 ranking points, the fewest points for an ATP No. 1 since the establishment of a new ranking points distribution in 2009.

Seeds
The top eight seeds receive a bye into the second round.

Draw

Finals

Top half

Section 1

Section 2

Bottom half

Section 3

Section 4

Qualifying

Seeds

Qualifiers

Lucky losers

Qualifying draw

First qualifier

Second qualifier

Third qualifier

Fourth qualifier

Fifth qualifier

Sixth qualifier

Seventh qualifier

References
Main draw
Qualifying draw

Men's Singles